The Bay Area Bandits was a women's American football team that played from 2010 to 2012.  Based in Fremont, California, the Bandits played their home games at Contra Costa College.

The Bandits switched to the Women's Football Alliance in 2011 after participating in the Independent Women's Football League in their debut season in 2010.

Season-By-Season

|-
| colspan="6" align="center" | Bay Area Bandits (IWFL2)
|-
|2010 || 7 || 4 || 0 || 1st IWFL2 Western Pacific West || Won Western Conference Semifinal (Modesto)Won Western Conference Championship (Wisconsin)Lost IWFL2 National Championship (Montreal)
|-
| colspan="6" align="center" | Bay Area Bandits (WFA)
|-
|2011 || 7 || 3 || 0 || 1st American North Pacific || Won American Conference Quarterfinal (Portland)Lost American Conference Semifinal (San Diego)
|-
|2012 || 8 || 2 || 0 || 1st American North Pacific || Won American Conference Quarterfinal (Central Cal)Lost American Conference Semifinal (San Diego)
|-
!Totals || 22 || 9 || 0
|colspan="2"| (including playoffs)

2010

Season schedule

2011

Standings

Season schedule

2012

Season schedule

References

American football teams in the San Francisco Bay Area
Women's Football Alliance teams
Fremont, California
American football teams established in 2010
American football teams disestablished in 2012
2010 establishments in California
2012 disestablishments in California